Streptomyces lavendofoliae is a bacterium species from the genus of Streptomyces which has been isolated from soil in Russia. Streptomyces lavendofoliae produces fosfazinomycin A, fosfazinomycin B and piperastatin B

See also 
 List of Streptomyces species

References

Further reading

External links
Type strain of Streptomyces lavendofoliae at BacDive -  the Bacterial Diversity Metadatabase	

lavendofoliae
Bacteria described in 1970